Yang Asha (also spelt Yang’asha) is a goddess of beauty, worshipped by Miao people. She serves as a tribute to the rich culture of the local people.

Legend
According to local legend, Yang Asha is a beautiful woman. She was deceived to marry the sun because of the lies of the dark clouds. However, soon after the wedding, the sun left and went to the East China Sea. Yang Asha endured the absence of the sun for six years. Some time later, she and Chang Gongyue, the moon and brother of the sun, fell in love. The two decided to elope, escaping to the horizon. After a lot of twists and turns, the two eventually lived a happy life.

Legacy 
Yang Asha has become a cultural brand in the region. Many places in Southeast Guizhou are named after her, such as Yang Asha Lake, Yang Asha Street, Yang Asha Square, and Yang Asha Avenue.
Since 2007, the Yang Asha Cultural Festival has been held in the county on June 6th of the lunar calendar every year.
 The 88-metre-high steel statue depicts Yang Asha was built in Jianhe County in 2017. The statue is the tallest in China. It was verified to be the world's largest of the Miao goddess Yang Asha by the World Record Certification Agency (WRCA) on December 16, 2017.

References

 Chinese deities
 Chinese goddesses
Beauty goddesses